The two-man bobsleigh results at the 1932 Winter Olympics in Lake Placid.

Medallists

Results

References

External links
1932 bobsleigh two-man results

Bobsleigh at the 1932 Winter Olympics